Hung Chung Yam (born 19 December 1963) is a Hong Kong former cyclist. He competed at the 1984 Summer Olympics and the 1988 Summer Olympics.

References

External links
 

1963 births
Living people
Hong Kong male cyclists
Olympic cyclists of Hong Kong
Cyclists at the 1984 Summer Olympics
Cyclists at the 1988 Summer Olympics
Place of birth missing (living people)
Cyclists at the 1982 Asian Games
Cyclists at the 1986 Asian Games
Cyclists at the 1994 Asian Games
Asian Games competitors for Hong Kong